Thomas André Marie Bouquerot de Voligny (27 August 1755 in Asnan – 26 August 1841 in Paris) was a French magistrate and politician. His brother was the general Jean-Baptiste Bouquerot des Essarts.

People of the French Revolution
1755 births
1841 deaths